Şerbeşti or Serbestî may refer to:

 Șerbești River
 Serbestî, an Ottoman newspaper founded in 1908
 Şerbeşti, a village in Ciortești, Iaşi County, Romania
 Şerbeşti, a village in Săucești, Bacău County, Romania
 Şerbeşti, a village in Vidra, Vrancea, Romania
 Şerbeştii Vechi, a village in Șendreni Commune, Galați County, Romania
 Șerbești, the former name of Ștefan cel Mare Commune, Neamț County, Romania

See also 
 Șerban (name)
 Șerbăneasa (disambiguation)
 Șerbănești (disambiguation)
 Șerbănescu (surname)